Macrochloa is a genus of flowering plants belonging to the family Poaceae.

Its native range is Western and Central Mediterranean.

Species:

Macrochloa antiatlantica 
Macrochloa tenacissima

References

Poaceae
Poaceae genera